is a 2000 Japanese kaiju film directed by Masaaki Tezuka, written by Hiroshi Kashiwabara and Wataru Mimura, produced by Shogo Tomiyama, and starring Misato Tanaka, Shōsuke Tanihara, Yuriko Hoshi, Masatoh Eve, and Toshiyuki Nagashima. Produced and distributed by Toho Studios, it is the 25th film in the Godzilla franchise and the second film in the franchise's Millennium series, as well as the 24th Godzilla film produced by Toho. The film features the fictional monster characters Godzilla and Megaguirus, portrayed by Tsutomu Kitagawa and Minoru Watanabe, respectively.

Godzilla vs. Megaguirus, despite featuring the same Godzilla suit that was used in its immediate predecessor, Godzilla 2000, ignores the events of the previous installment, as well as every other entry in the franchise aside from the original 1954 film Godzilla. Godzilla vs. Megaguirus premiered at the Tokyo International Film Festival on November 3, 2000, and was released theatrically in Japan on December 16, 2000. The film was followed by Godzilla, Mothra and King Ghidorah: Giant Monsters All-Out Attack, which was released on December 15, 2001.

Plot
The prologue of the film acknowledges the events of the first Godzilla film (using the 1954 Godzilla monster rather than a successor Godzilla), while inventing its own timeline, explaining that the Oxygen Destroyer was never used here and that the capital of Japan was moved from Tokyo to Osaka. In 1966, Godzilla attacks the first Japanese nuclear plant in Tokai, Ibaraki Prefecture. After this, the G-Graspers, a section of Japan Self-Defense Forces, is dedicated to combating Godzilla. In 1996, clean plasma energy replaces nuclear energy, but this does not deter Godzilla from attacking the original plasma energy reactor. As a result, plasma energy is banned in the country.

In 2001, an experimental satellite-based weapon that fires miniature black holes, called the Dimension Tide, opens a wormhole through which a prehistoric dragonfly enters the present and deposits a single egg before exiting through the wormhole. A boy named Jun Hayasaka finds the egg and takes it with him when he moves to Tokyo. The egg starts oozing a strange liquid, so Jun throws the egg in the sewer. The egg, actually a mass of hundreds of eggs, splits up and starts growing when exposed to water, hatching into large dragonfly larvae called Meganulon. Late one night, a couple out on a date walk into a back alley to be alone.

The woman leaves to go get drinks while her boyfriend waits for her in the alley. While listening to music, he doesn't notice a sewer barrier shaking and a Meganulon leaps out and attacks him, grabbing him with its claws and spitting some kind of viscous slime in his mouth before the creature drags him inside the barrier and kills him, leaving his headphones behind. When his girlfriend comes back with the drinks, she doesn't find him anywhere, but instead finds his headphones covered in slime on the ground. She crouches down and picks up the headphones, wondering where the slime came from, when she hears a strange noise coming from behind her. The woman, nervously, drops the headphones as Meganulon appears behind her.

When she turns around, Meganulon spits slime on her face and knocks her down to the ground. The woman tries to fight off the insect, but Meganulon grabs her waist in its claws and drags her across the ground and inside the sewer barrier. The barrier shakes again as the woman is heard screaming before being killed and eaten by Meganulon. The insect, then, scales the side of a building and molts into Meganula. Soon after, a portion of Shibuya is flooded and a colony of Meganulon molt into a swarm of adult Meganula.

Meanwhile, Godzilla appears in search of a source of nuclear energy, despite the edict shutting down all such attractants after its three previous appearances. While Godzilla is fighting the G-Graspers, who are assisted by rebellious scientist Hajime Kudo, the swarm of Meganula are attracted in turn to Godzilla's energy, and attack it. During the course of the battle, the Dimension Tide is launched, but Godzilla survives the attack. Most of the Meganula are killed by both Godzilla and the Dimension Tide, but a few manage to drain off some of Godzilla's energy and return to the sewer, with Godzilla seemingly following them. With the last of their strength, the Meganula inject Godzilla's energy into a huge, sleeping larva that is in a giant, pulsating cocoon. It molts and appears from the water as Megaguirus, the queen of the Meganula.

After destroying part of Shibuya with shock waves generated by her beating wings, Megaguirus heads to the waterfront and faces Godzilla. As they engage in a lengthy battle, she uses her speed to avoid Godzilla's attacks, but Godzilla eventually uses its own speed against her. As she flies toward Godzilla, it lunges forward with its dorsal fins in her path. She flies into the fins, and one of her arms is severed. Megaguirus, having been mutated by Godzilla's energy, generates a blast similar to Godzilla's atomic breath and knocks Godzilla down. Megaguirus speeds forward with the stinger on its long tail lowered, trying to stab Godzilla between the eyes. In a climactic moment, Godzilla catches the stinger in its mouth and crushes it in its jaws. Godzilla finally blasts Megaguirus with atomic breath, causing it to burst into flames and die.

It is revealed that Godzilla was attracted to a secret plasma energy project housed at the Science Institute, in violation of the ban. The G-Graspers continue their mission to destroy Godzilla, but with the Dimension Tide falling out of orbit they are unable to get a lock on it. The vengeful Major Kiriko Tsujimori pilots a ship towards Godzilla, ejecting only at the last second. The Dimension Tide is able to lock on to the craft and fires just before burning up on reentry; Godzilla blasts at the approaching black hole with its atomic heat ray, but vanishes. In a postlude, however, Tsujimori again enlists Kudo to investigate suspicious seismic activity; then in an after-credits scene at Jun's school, an earthquake happens and Godzilla's roar is heard again.

Cast

Release
Godzilla vs. Megaguirus was released theatrically in Japan on December 16, 2000, where it was distributed by Toho. The film was released directly to television in the United States by Columbia TriStar with an English dub. There are some inconsistencies in the translation of the dub however, including one scene where Hajime tells Kiriko that body building is a waste of time since they'll be making Godzilla disappear "up his own butthole" rather than their artificially created "black hole" as the original version states.

Reception
Godzilla vs. Megaguirus was released on December 16, 2000, to mixed reactions. Ed Godziszewski of Monster Zero said, "While not the best example of filmmaking, Godzilla vs. Megaguirus nonetheless succeeds as an entertaining film." Miles Imhoff of Toho Kingdom said, "Run-of-the-mill, mediocre, and sterile are the three words that best describe Godzilla vs. Megaguirus. It is a movie that attempts to be creative and edgy, but somehow fails, leaving one wanting with futility to really try to enjoy the film."

Stomp Tokyo said "the music is pretty good" but "this movie isn't a step forward in the ways that it really should be." Mike Bogue of American Kaiju said, "Though not the best of the post-Showa Godzilla movies, Godzilla vs. Megaguirus is one of the most entertaining." Ian Jane of DVD Talk said, "While not the best entry in the Godzilla series, Godzilla vs. Megaguirus ... [is] still a really solid entry with some great special effects and a very memorable monster mash finale."

Matt Paprocki of Blog Critics called the film "a true classic in the series," adding: "It's impossible not to be entertained somewhat, whether you're looking for camp value or serious giant monster action. This one has everything that is required of the [kaiju] genre." Andrew Pragasam of The Spinning Image called the film a "flawed, but entertaining comic book extravaganza" that "only partially delivers as a slam-bang monster epic" and suffers from "a lack of likeable characters."

Home media
The film has been released at least twice on home media.  The first was by Columbia/Tristar Home Entertainment, on January 27, 2004.

The second release was by Sony on Blu-ray as part of the Toho Godzilla Collection, and was released on May 6, 2014, on 2-Disc double feature with Godzilla vs. Destoroyah.

References

Bibliography

External links

 
 
 
 

2000 films
2000s Japanese-language films
2000s monster movies
2000 science fiction films
Films about insects
Films directed by Masaaki Tezuka
Films set in 1954
Films set in 1966
Films set in 1996
Films set in 2001
Films set in Tokyo
Films set in Osaka
Films set in Ibaraki Prefecture
Films set in Yamanashi Prefecture
Films set in the Pacific Ocean
Films set on fictional islands
Giant monster films
Godzilla films
Japanese alternate history films
Japanese sequel films
Kaiju films
Reboot films
Toho films
Films about wormholes
Films with screenplays by Wataru Mimura
Films scored by Michiru Ōshima
2000s Japanese films